Kennis Voor Het Leven  (Knowledge for Life) is a 2005 Dutch and Malian film.

Synopsis 
What is the largest part of all knowledge? In order to answer this question a young scholar of a Koran school sets out on a seven-day journey of discovery through Djenné, a West African city of ancient beauty.

Screenings 
The movie was included in the 2005 African Film Festival of Cordoba. It was also included in the 2005 International Film Festival Rotterdam. Since 2010 the film is included in the feature film Bardsongs.

External links

References 

2005 films
Malian short films
Dutch short films
Malian drama films
Dutch drama films